Voices of Babylon is the third studio album by the British band The Outfield, released during the spring of 1989 and which spawned an eponymous single.  It was the group's last album to feature drummer Alan Jackman until the release of Replay in 2011. It was also their final album on the Columbia label. Following the album's release, and with their commercial success slipping, the band parted ways with Jackman and hired Paul Read as a replacement for the album's tour.

This album features a unique script similar to what is known as the Pigpen cipher. On the album cover, the script says "OUTFIELD" and the liner notes show the title of each album track in that script.

Track listing
"Voices of Babylon"
"My Paradise"
"Part of Your Life"
"Shelter Me"
"The Night Ain't Over"
"No Point"
"Taken By Surprise"
"Reach Out"
"Makin' Up"
"Inside Your Skin"

All songs were written by John Spinks, except for "Taken By Surprise", which was written by John Spinks and Tony Lewis.

Personnel 
Tony Lewis - vocals, bass guitar
John Spinks - guitar, vocals, keyboards, songwriter
Alan Jackman - drums

Additional musicians
David Kahne - keyboards, producer

Singles
The album's title track was a Top 40 hit single, peaking at #25 on the Billboard Hot 100 and #2 on the Billboard Mainstream Rock Tracks chart. The second-single "My Paradise" peaked at #72 on the Billboard Hot 100, not achieving the expected success. "Part of Your Life" was released as a promotional single, but failed to gain significant airplay. 

"The Night Ain't Over" was released as a single in Canada, featuring a previously unreleased track "Better Get Ready" as the B-Side.

External links

References

The Outfield albums
1989 albums
Albums produced by David Kahne
Albums produced by David Leonard (record producer)
Columbia Records albums